Hendovan or Hendevan or Hendvan may refer to:
 Hendovan, Firuraq
 Hendevan, Rahal